Porky's Five & Ten is a 1938 Warner Bros. Looney Tunes cartoon short directed by Bob Clampett. The short was released on April 16, 1938, and stars Porky Pig.

Porky sets sail for the Boola-Boola islands in the South Seas with a sailboat full of cargo and plans to open a five and dime store, until a swordfish cuts a hole in the hull.

Plot
Porky's sailboat is sailing off to the Boola-Boola islands, a fictitious set of tropical islands in the South Seas with enough cargo to open up a five and dime store.

Thirteen days into the journey, Porky is writing in the Ship's Log that he is nearing land, "...I hope, I hope, I hope".

A fish spots the Petunia coming his way and swims to the bottom of the ocean to tell his friends and says, "Hey guys, a ship is coming through!" (in fish-talk) and they all swim to near the surface, just under the boat. A swordfish comes along and cuts a hole in the bottom of the boat and all of Porky's goods fall to the bottom of the ocean! As Porky falls out too, the swordfish pushes him back into the boat and closes up the hole. The swordfish unscrews his "sword" from his face, and gives it to a nearby fish to stand guard (ensuring Porky doesn't try to open the hole again).

Out of the sinking goods falls a lunchbox and when it hits bottom, opens up to form a canteen where a fish inside wearing a chef's hat is flipping burgers. A group of seahorses see a record player and as it starts playing, they swim onto the rotating record and form a merry-go-round. Smaller fish jump on their backs, imitating children on a ride. A fish swallows a teapot which whistles a tune while emitting steam and the opening and closing of the lid. Another fish swallows a clock with a moving pendulum and happily rubs his stomach. Then the pendulum starts swinging again from inside his stomach, much to his surprise, as he starts to walk away, his hips swaying from side to side. A different fish passes by making Hugh Herbert's noises (Woo-woo!) and drags a sign saying "FOO".

As Porky lifts the hole cover to see what was happening (note, it opens inward now instead of outward, as before), he gets water squirted in his face by the sentry fish. Another fish swallows a radio and begins walking. As he walks, tuning sounds are made before the radio announcer (Mel Blanc) is speaking, the fish looks around for someone speaking and does not realize the sound is coming from inside his stomach. The announcer describes how two giant bombers dropped a bomb on a small village, (Owasegoo - it sounds like gibberish, as it was apparently dubbed over after the cartoon's release), and the fish goes through all the motions of the bombing and gunfire sounds. As the shelling comes to a stop, the fish wipes sweat from his brow, only to have a program called "Gangster Busters" (a parody of Gang Busters) began playing including the sounds of police sirens and rapid-fire gunplay, and goes through all the motions again until he is bounced off the ocean floor which causes the radio to be up-chucked.

Bowls and boxes are the next to follow, forming a hotel with a ballroom inside.  Two electric eels swim by and form the marquee "Holly" and "wood" above the entrance and begin blinking on and off.  Two other fish enter with flashlights on forming spotlights, as seen in front of hotels and theaters with big events and movie premiers in Hollywood that were common at the time.  Two other fish have bowler hats drop on them, and as they turn toward the camera, acquire a likeness of Laurel and Hardy, and they swim into the Hotel.  Another fish steps into some large shoes, and impersonates a Greta Garbo character and she says, "I want to be alone", a line in the 1932 classic Garbo movie "Grand Hotel".  Another fish swallows an hourglass and takes on the figure of Mae West, as a necklace and hat fall onto her and she also catches a parasol. She utters, "come up and see me sometime" as she struts into the Hollywood Legion Stadium to watch a boxing match between Gene Tuna (a play on the American Boxer Gene Tunney) versus the Champion.  The two boxing fish were duking it out on the keys of a typewriter in the stadium, and as the carriage comes to the end of the line, the typewriter's ding is heard, and each fish backs into his own corner, and another fish pushes the carriage back to the beginning of a new line.  The keys spell out what is happening in the fight.

Back to Porky, he's now frowning because all of his goods have been lost, and puts a worm on a hook and lowers it into the water.  The sentry fish sees this and pulls out his own fishing pole with baited hook and the worm jumps onto the hook and the sentry fish reels it in and eats it.

Later, the ballroom guests are partying and waving their drinking glasses around when a spotlight appears on the curtain. As the curtain rises, we see some dancing legs and as the curtain rises further, it turns out to be a 10-legged octopus! (The crowd boos at the ugly performance.)  The fish that swallowed the hourglass dances with something resembling a walrus or seal; his waistline fits together perfectly with the hourglass in her stomach as they dance. The fish that swallowed the clock, having overcome his initial surprise, now relaxes as the pendulum keeps swinging inside his stomach.

A whale appears under Porky's boat and the sentry fish knocks on the hole cover. As Porky opens the cover and says, "Who's there?" the whale spouts water from his blowhole, which forces Porky back onto the boat. But then, a tremendous waterspout is coming towards the ship and the vicinity beneath the sea.

Back in the makeshift hotel, the fish were busy dancing and having a good time until the radio announcer interrupted temporarily for the news of the waterspout coming near the Boola Boola Islands. The fish ignored the news for a moment and resumed dancing until the announcer declared them to scram before the twister hits the area. And the sea creatures did, in their own fashionable way. The waterspout picked up the ship and vacuumed the lost contents out of the water until it died down and both the boat and cargo are safely back where they belong as Porky resumes his journey.

The sentry fish spits water in disappointment, but Porky comes back and sprays him with a spritzer-bottle, and the fish starts crying and the cartoon comes to a close.

Notes
A colorized version is available on Cartoon Network, which was made available by Warner Bros. Entertainment, Inc. in 1992.

Music
"The Merry-Go-Round Broke Down", uncredited, by Cliff Friend and Dave Franklin
"Happiness Ahead", uncredited, by Allie Wrubel and Mort Dixon
"Hooray for Hollywood", uncredited, by Richard A. Whiting and Johnny Mercer
"Bei mir Bist du Schön", uncredited, by Sholom Secunda
"Nagasaki", uncredited, by Harry Warren
"Let That Be a Lesson to You", uncredited, by Richard A. Whiting
"I'm Like a Fish out of Water", uncredited, by Richard A. Whiting
"Sing, You Son of a Gun", uncredited, by Richard A. Whiting
"Love Is on the Air Tonight", uncredited, by Richard A. Whiting

References

External links

1938 films
1938 animated films
Looney Tunes shorts
Warner Bros. Cartoons animated short films
Films directed by Bob Clampett
1930s American animated films
Animated films about fish
Porky Pig films
Films set in the Pacific Ocean
Films set on ships
1930s English-language films